Abza may refer to:
 Abza-e Sar Dasht, Chaharmahal and Bakhtiari Province
 Abza, Ilam